Boon Keng is a subzone within the planning area of Kallang, Singapore, as defined by the Urban Redevelopment Authority (URA). The smallest in terms of physical area among the nine subzones that make up Kallang, Boon Keng is bounded by the Pelton Canal in the north; the Kallang–Paya Lebar Expressway (KPE) and Sims Way in the east; Sims Avenue in the south; and the Kallang River in the west.

Primarily a prime residential area, this area is served by Boon Keng MRT station along the North East Line and Kallang MRT station along the East West Line. A plot of land at Lorong 3 Geylang is slated for future development into a new residential precinct. Geylang West Community Club is located within this subzone.

This area took its name from Dr Lim Boon Keng, a prominent figure in Singapore history.

See also
Lim Boon Keng

References

External links

Places in Singapore
Central Region, Singapore
Kallang